Frentress Lake is a backwater lake located on the eastern side of the Mississippi River in Jo Daviess County in northern Illinois, to the southeast of East Dubuque. Homes on Frentress Lake experienced flooding in April 2011.

References

Bodies of water of Jo Daviess County, Illinois
Lakes of Illinois
Lakes of the Mississippi River